Kulpi Assembly constituency is a Legislative Assembly constituency of South 24 Parganas district in the Indian State of West Bengal.

Overview
As per order of the Delimitation Commission in respect of the Delimitation of constituencies in the West Bengal, Kulpi Assembly constituency is composed of the following:
 Kulpi community development block

Kulpi Assembly constituency is a part of No. 20 Mathurapur (Lok Sabha constituency).

Members of Legislative Assembly

Election Results

Legislative Assembly Election 2011

Legislative Assembly Elections 1977-2006
In 2006, Sakuntala Paik of CPI(M) won the Kulpi Assembly constituency defeating her nearest rival Jogaranjan Halder of AITC. Jogaranjan Halder of AITC defeated  Sakuntala Paik of CPI(M) in 2001. Sakuntala Paik of CPI(M) defeated Kirtibas Sardar of INC in 1996, Krishnadhan Halder of CPI(M) defeated Jogaranjan Halder of INC in 1991, Kirtibas Sardar of INC in 1987, and Santosh Kumar Mondal of INC in 1982 and 1977.

Legislative Assembly Elections 1952-1972
Santosh Kumar Mondal of INC won in 1972. Mukunda Ram Mondal of CPI(M) won in 1971. Murari Mohan Halder of Bangla Congress won in 1969. N.K.Halder of INC won in 1967. Hrishikesh Halder, Independent politician, won in 1962. Hansadhwaj Dhara of INC won in 1957. In 1952, Kulpi Assembly constituency had a joint seat. Nalini Kanta Halder of KMPP and Pran Krishna Kumar of BJS won in 1952.

References

Notes

Citations

Assembly constituencies of West Bengal
Politics of South 24 Parganas district